Lithuania participated in the Eurovision Song Contest 2004 with the song "What's Happened to Your Love?" written by Michalis Antoniou, Linas Adomaitis and Camden-MS. The song was performed by Linas and Simona. The Lithuanian broadcaster Lithuanian National Radio and Television (LRT) returned to the Eurovision Song Contest after a one-year absence following their relegation from 2003 as one of the bottom five countries in the 2002 contest. LRT organised the national final "Eurovizijos" dainų konkurso nacionalinė atranka (Eurovision Song Contest national selection) in order to select the Lithuanian entry for the 2004 contest in Istanbul, Turkey. The national final took place over seven weeks and involved 52 competing entries. In the final, eighteen entries remained and "What's Happened to Your Love?" performed by Linas and Simona was selected as the winner by the combination of votes from a jury panel and a public vote.

Lithuania competed in the semi-final of the Eurovision Song Contest which took place on 12 May 2004. Performing during the show in position 12, "What's Happened to Your Love?" was not announced among the top 10 entries of the semi-final and therefore did not qualify to compete in the final. It was later revealed that Lithuania placed sixteenth out of the 22 participating countries in the semi-final with 26 points.

Background 

Prior to the 2004 contest, Lithuania had participated in the Eurovision Song Contest four times since its first entry in 1994. The nation's best placing in the contest was thirteenth, which it achieved in 2001 with the song "You Got Style" performed by Skamp. In the 2002 contest, "Happy You" performed by Aivaras scored 12 points and placed 23rd.
 
For the 2004 contest, the Lithuanian national broadcaster, Lithuanian National Radio and Television (LRT), broadcast the event within Lithuania and organised the selection process for the nation's entry. Other than the internal selection of their debut entry in 1994, Lithuania has selected their entry consistently through a national final procedure. LRT confirmed their intentions to participate at the 2004 Eurovision Song Contest on 1 October 2003 and announced the organization of "Eurovizijos" dainų konkurso nacionalinė atranka, which would be the national final to select Lithuania's entry for Istanbul.

Before Eurovision

"Eurovizijos" dainų konkurso nacionalinė atranka 
"Eurovizijos" dainų konkurso nacionalinė atranka (Eurovision Song Contest national selection) was the national final format developed by LRT in order to select Lithuania's entry for the Eurovision Song Contest 2004. The competition involved a seven-week-long process that commenced on 3 January 2004 and concluded with a winning song and artist on 14 February 2004. The seven shows were broadcast on LTV and LTV2 as well as online via the broadcaster's website lrt.lt.

Format 
The 2004 competition involved 52 entries and consisted of seven shows. The first six shows were the semi-finals consisting of seven or nine entries each. Nine entries participated in each of the first five semi-finals resulting in the top three that proceeded to the final, while seven entries participated in the sixth semi-final resulting in the top two that proceeded to the final. The highest scoring non-qualifying act in the semi-finals also advanced to the final. The results of the semi-finals were determined solely by public televoting. In the final, the winner was selected from the remaining eighteen entries by the 50/50 combination of votes from a jury panel and public televoting. Ties were decided in favour of the entry that received the most votes from the public, however, a tie for the first place would be decided by the jury. The public could vote through telephone and SMS voting in all shows with the addition of online and postcard voting during the semi-finals.

Competing entries 
LRT opened a submission period on 1 October 2003 for artists and songwriters to submit their entries with the deadline on 1 December 2003. On 29 December 2003, LRT announced the 54 entries selected for the competition from over 70 submissions received. The final changes to the list of 54 competing acts were later made with the withdrawal of the songs "Skrydis" performed by Humanoidai and H. Grigorian, and "Vel" performed by Toys.

Shows

Semi-finals
The seven semi-finals of the competition aired from the LRT studios in Vilnius between 3 January and 7 February 2004, hosted by Aurimas Dautartas and Darius Užkuraitis and featured the 52 competing entries. In each of the first five semi-finals the top three advanced to the final, while the top two entries of the sixth semi-final advanced to the final. "I Do, I Do" performed by Geltona also proceeded to the final as the highest scoring non-qualifying act in the semi-finals.

Final 
The final of the competition took place on 14 February 2004 at the Kaunas Sports Hall in Kaunas and was hosted by Aurimas Dautarta and Greta Sapkaitė. The members of the jury consisted of Jonas Jučas (member of Seimas, organiser of the Kaunas Jazz festival), Rosita Čivilytė (singer), Vytautas Juozapaitis (opera singer), Daiva Rinkevičiūtė (Lietuvos rytas journalist), Ramūnas Zilnys (Lietuvos rytas journalist), Darius Užkuraitis (Lietuvos Radijas music producer), Edita Vilčiauskienė (Lietuvos Radijas music editor) and Jonas Vilimas (LRT music producer). The show featured the remaining eighteen entries that qualified from the semi-finals and the combined points from the jury vote and the public vote resulted in a tie between Edmundas Kucinskas, Linas and Simona, and Rūta Ščiogolevaitė. The tie was resolved after each jury member cast one vote for one of the three songs, and "What's Happened to Your Love?" performed by Linas and Simona was selected as the winner after receiving the most votes. Four of the jury members voted for Linas and Simona, while three voted for Rūta Ščiogolevaitė and one voted for Edmundas Kucinskas.

At Eurovision

It was announced that the competition's format would be expanded to include a semi-final in 2004. According to the rules, all nations with the exceptions of the host country, the "Big Four" (France, Germany, Spain and the United Kingdom), and the ten highest placed finishers in the 2003 contest are required to qualify from the semi-final on 12 May 2004 in order to compete for the final on 15 May 2004; the top ten countries from the semi-final progress to the final. On 23 March 2004, a special allocation draw was held which determined the running order for the semi-final and Lithuania was set to perform in position 12, following the entry from Ukraine and before the entry from Albania. At the end of the semi-final, Lithuania was not announced among the top 10 entries and therefore failed to qualify to compete in the final. It was later revealed that Lithuania placed sixteenth in the semi-final, receiving a total of 26 points.

The semi-final and final were broadcast in Lithuania on LTV with commentary by Darius Užkuraitis. The Lithuanian spokesperson, who announced the Lithuanian votes during the final, was Rolandas Vilkončius.

Voting 
Below is a breakdown of points awarded to Lithuania and awarded by Lithuania in the semi-final and grand final of the contest. The nation awarded its 12 points to Ukraine in the semi-final and the final of the contest.

Points awarded to Lithuania

Points awarded by Lithuania

References

2004
Countries in the Eurovision Song Contest 2004
Eurovision